Washford Pyne is a village and civil parish in Devon, England. It is 7 miles NE of Morchard Road railway station and 8 N by W of Crediton.

The local church is dedicated to Saint Peter and the base of the tower dates from the 15th century with the rest of the church rebuilt in 1882. It is a grade II* listed building.

References

Villages in Mid Devon District